Francesco IV Gonzaga (7 May 1586 – 22 December 1612), was Duke of Mantua and (as Francesco II) Duke of Montferrat between 9 February and 22 December 1612.

Biography
Born in Mantua, he was the eldest son of Duke Vincenzo I and Eleonora de' Medici.

In 1607, Claudio Monteverdi dedicated his opera L'Orfeo to Francesco. The title page of the opera bears the dedication "Al serenissimo signor D. Francesco Gonzaga, Prencipe di Mantoua, & di Monferato, &c."

Francesco became Duke upon his father's death on 9 February 1612. He died at Mantua on 22 December 1612 without male heirs. He was succeeded by his brother Ferdinand; however, Charles Emmanuel I, Duke of Savoy, the father of Francesco's wife Margaret of Savoy, disputed this, leading to the War of the Montferrat Succession (1613–1617).

Family
On 19 February 1608 he married in Turin, Margaret of Savoy (1589–1655), daughter of Charles Emmanuel I, Duke of Savoy. They had:
 Maria (29 July 1609 – 14 August 1660); married in 1627 Charles II of Gonzaga, Duke of Rethel and Nevers.
 Ludovico (27 April 1611 – 3 August 1612).
 Eleanore (12 September 1612 – 13 September 1612).

Honours
 Grand Master of the Order of the Redeemer

Ancestry

References

Sources

|-

|-

1586 births
1612 deaths
Francesco IV
Francesco IV
Francesco IV
16th-century Italian nobility
17th-century Italian nobility
Burials at the Palatine Basilica of Santa Barbara (Mantua)